Victory Boulevard may refer to:

Victory Boulevard (Staten Island)
Victory Boulevard (Los Angeles)